Jon Nuss (born June 22, 1987 in Phoenix, Arizona) is an American pair skater. With former partner Jessica Rose Paetsch, he is the 2008 U.S. Junior Champion and a two-time bronze medalist at the Junior Grand Prix Final.

Career 
He teamed up with Jessica Rose Paetsch in May 2005. Paetsch & Nuss are the 2006 US National novice champions and 2007 national junior bronze medalists. They won the bronze medal at the 2006 Junior Grand Prix Final.

Although they placed fourth on the day, they were later awarded the bronze medal from the 2007–2008 Junior Grand Prix Final following the retroactive disqualification of first-place-finishers Vera Bazarova and Yuri Larionov due to a positive doping sample from Larionov. This bronze medal guaranteed Paetsch & Nuss a spot on the 2008–2009 Grand Prix of Figure Skating. They were assigned to the 2008 Skate Canada International Grand Prix competition.

Paetsch and Nuss announced the end of their partnership on July 14, 2008.

Competitive highlights

Men's singles

Pairs
(with Paetsch)

References

External links
Official site

1987 births
Living people
American male pair skaters